Oliver Práznovský (born 15 February 1991) is a Slovak professional footballer who plays as a centre-back for Chrobry Głogów.

Club career
He previously played for MFK Ružomberok and MŠK Rimavská Sobota and MŠK Žilina.

References

External links
 
 MFK Ružomberok profile

1991 births
Footballers from Bratislava
Living people
Slovak footballers
Slovak expatriate footballers
Slovakia youth international footballers
Slovakia under-21 international footballers
Association football defenders
FK Inter Bratislava players
MŠK Žilina players
MŠK Rimavská Sobota players
MFK Ružomberok players
FK Senica players
GKS Katowice players
FC Luch Vladivostok players
FC ViOn Zlaté Moravce players
Chrobry Głogów players
Slovak Super Liga players
I liga players
Armenian Premier League players
Slovak expatriate sportspeople in Poland
Slovak expatriate sportspeople in Russia
Slovak expatriate sportspeople in Armenia
Expatriate footballers in Poland
Expatriate footballers in Russia
Expatriate footballers in Armenia